Tan is a common Chinese surname 譚. It is considered the 56th most common surname.

Origin
Two origins have been suggested for the Tan surname:

 The surname came from the ancient State of Tan which was located in the western part of what is now Shandong Province. During the Spring and Autumn period, this state was conquered by the neighbouring State of Qi. The court changed their surname to Tan in remembrance of their defeated homeland, and later prospered in Hunan Province.
 The surname came from the less common surname 談, another with the same pronunciation in Mandarin Chinese and Cantonese Chinese. In order to avoid the revenge of their enemies, the clan leaders changed it to 譚.

A study by geneticist Yuan Yida has found that people with either of the two Tan surnames are especially concentrated in Hunan Province which would tend to support these accounts. This does not mean that they are the most common surnames in that province.

Romanisation and pronunciation 
Tan is the Chinese character's Hanyu Pinyin romanisation in Mandarin Chinese. It is pronounced and romanised differently in different languages and dialects.

In Cantonese Chinese, it is romanised as Taam4 in Jyutping and Tàahm in Cantonese Yale. It is romanised as Tam in Hong Kong and Macau.
In Toisanese Chinese, it may be romanised as Thom, Hom, Ham or Hum.
In Hokkien Chinese, Teochew Chinese and Hainanese Chinese, it is romanised as Thâm in POJ.
In Malaysia, Indonesia and Singapore (Overseas Chinese communities), it is sometimes romanised as Tham.
In Filipino and other Philippine languages (Overseas Chinese communities), it is romanised as Tan.
In Japan, it may be romanised as Tan.

Prominent people

Tam
Adrian Tam, American politician representing Waikiki and Ala Moana
Alan Tam,, Hong Kong singer and actor
Jeremy Tam Man Ho (born 1975), Hong Kong politician
Tam Kung,, Chinese folk hero who was reputed to be able to forecast the weather
Patrick Tam Kar Ming (born 1948), Hong Kong film director and editor
Patrick Tam Yiu Man (born 1969), Hong Kong actor and singer
Roman Tam (stage name , 1945–2002), Hong Kong singer
Theresa Tam (born 1965 in Hong Kong), Chief Public Health Officer of Canada
Vivienne Tam (born 1957), Hong Kong fashion designer
Tam Yiu-chung (born 1949), Hong Kong politician

Tan

Amy Tan (born 1952), American writer
Tan Dun (born 1957), Chinese composer and pianist
Tan Jing (谭晶, born 1977), Chinese singer, philanthropist and congresswoman
Karen Tan Puay Kiow (born 1962), Singaporean army officer
Tan Lee Wai (born 1970), Malaysian badminton player
Melinda Tan, British academic
Mely G. Tan (born 1930), Indonesian sociologist  
Milagrosa Tan (1958–2019), Filipina politician
Shaun Tan (born 1974), Australian author and illustrator
Tan Sitong (1865–1898), Chinese politician
Tan Songyun (born 1990), Chinese actress
Tan Sui Hoon (born 1963), Malaysian badminton player
Tan Yankai (born 1880)  Chinese politician and Premier of the Republic of China.
Yuanyuan Tan (譚元元, born 1977), Chinese ballet dancer; Principal Dancer at the San Francisco Ballet
Tan Yuanchun (1586–1637), Chinese scholar
Tan Zhenlin (1902–1983), Chinese politician
Tan Zhonglin (born 1822) Qing dynasty scholar-official. Governor and viceroy of Shaanxi and Gansu Provinces.

Tom
Kiana Tom, (born 1965), American television host
Lauren Tom, (born 1961), American actress
Tom Hom (born 1927), American politician

Hom 
Ken Hom (born 1949), American chef
Sharon Hom (born 1951), Hong Kong-born American human rights law professor
Alice Y. Hom (born 1967), American LGBTQ community activist

Clan villages
Bihou

See also
List of common Chinese surnames
Chinese surname
Chinese given name
Generation name
Chinese kin
Chinese compound surname
Vietnamese name

References

Chinese-language surnames
Individual Chinese surnames
Surnames of Malaysian origin